The Furman Paladins men's basketball team is the basketball team that represents Furman University in Greenville, South Carolina, United States. The school's team currently competes in the Southern Conference. They are currently led by head coach Bob Richey and play their home games at the Timmons Arena. In 2018, the Paladins entered the College Basketball AP Poll for the first time in program history, coming in at number 23 on December 10. Furman last appeared in the NCAA tournament in 1980; however, they made an appearance in 2023 after a 43-year absence in the tournament, the 15th longest drought in NCAA Division I Tournament history. During that tournament Furman would upset 4 seeded Virginia in the first round.

Postseason

NCAA Division I Tournament results
The Paladins have appeared in the NCAA Division I Tournament 7 times. Their combined record is 2–8.

NIT results
The Paladins have appeared in the National Invitation Tournament (NIT) 2 times. Their combined record is 0W–2L.

CIT results
The Paladins have appeared in the CollegeInsider.com Postseason Tournament (CIT) 3 times. Their combined record is 3W–3L.

Retired numbers
Furman has retired six jersey numbers.

References

External links
Website